Now in a Minute is the debut studio album by British singer-songwriter Donna Lewis, released in 1996. The album is best known for the single "I Love You Always Forever", which broke the airplay record in the United States for exceeding one million spins on radio, becoming the most-played single up to that point. Two other singles were released from the album, "Without Love" and "Mother".

A 25th anniversary edition, including the same tracks as the original CD, was released on vinyl in the United States on 2 April 2021. Subsequently, an expanded edition of the album, including remixes and B-sides, was released on digital platforms on the album's exact 25th anniversary, 7 May 2021.

Track listing

Personnel
Credits for Now in a Minute adapted from the liner notes.
Donna Lewis – vocals, keyboards, piano, omnichord
Tony Franklin – bass
Harvey Jones – Sequential Circuits Prophet 5, mellotron flutes, keyboards
Jimmy Bralower – drum programming
Gerry Leonard – electric guitar, acoustic guitar
Bill Dillon – guitar
Mark Hutchins – additional keyboards, percussive scissors
Dean Sharp – drum programming
Eric Friedlander – cello
Kevin Killen – omnichord
Grainne Fitzpatrick- chef

Charts and certifications

Weekly charts

Year-end charts

Certifications

References

1996 debut albums
Donna Lewis albums
Atlantic Records albums